Lago Colombo is a lake in the Province of Bergamo, Lombardy, Italy.

Lakes of Lombardy